Mattersey Thorpe is a small village in the Bassetlaw district of northern Nottinghamshire, England. It is in the civil parish of Mattersey.

Toponymy 
Mattersey was Madressei or Madreisseig in the Domesday Book of 1086, meaning 'well-watered land', implying a flood plain area due to its proximity to a river.

Mattersey Thorpe was not recorded in Domesday, but was first reported in county records as Thorpe in 1298. The thorpe is used here in Norse form as a 'hamlet adjoining a village or chief settlement.'

It was further recorded as Thorp juxta Madersey in 1305, with a recognisably modern form appearing in 1545 Nottinghamshire post mortem records as Matterseythorp.

Geography 
Mattersey Thorpe is surrounded by the following local areas:

 Everton and Harwell to the north
 Mattersey to the south east
 Ranskill and Scrooby to the west.
This area lies in the north within Bassetlaw district and the wider county.

The historic core of the Mattersey Thorpe is located where Breck Lane meets Thorpe Lane. This end of the area is predominantly a farming community, interspersed by farms, the occasional residential dwelling and greenfield land. the land elevation here is approximately 

The area stands on the west bank of the River Idle.

Governance 
The area, along with Mattersey village are both within Mattersey parish.

Mattersey Parish Council manage the lowest levels of public duties in the settlements.

The middle tier of local government is performed by Bassetlaw District Council.

Nottinghamshire County Council provides the highest level strategic services locally.

History 
Before the Norman Conquest in 1066 AD, Mattersey was the manor of Earl Tostig Godwinson. After the historic Battle of Hastings in which he died, Mattersey was given to a Norman family who took the name of De Mattersey or Maresay.

Mattersey Thorpe comprised 4 farms and their associated dwellings (one dating to 1648) until 1940. During World War II, 157 pre-fabricated bungalows were built as an emergency housing settlement by the government for workers at the munitions factory that had been established in nearby Ranskill. Many of the roads then built were named after notable wartime figures (Keyes Rise, Winston Green, Bader Rise, Wavell Crescent, Cunningham Close, Newall Close, Wilson Close). There was also a shop, school and club building. After the war, the district council rebuilt part of the area in the 1970s with urban-styled council housing. In the 1990s a development of market housing of 2 and 3 bed bungalows was completed on the remaining land.

Culture and community 
Facilities include:
 The Green - includes a play area for young children
 The Playing Fields
 Community centre

Landmarks 
There are three listed buildings, all at Grade II and in the historic portion of the village:

 The Gables, which was the old hall dating from the 1600s, before being converted into three dwellings
 Bleake House Farmhouse
 Granary Cottage

References 

Villages in Nottinghamshire
Bassetlaw